Mariam Barghouti born in Atlanta, Georgia, June 23, 1993, is a Palestinian-American writer, blogger, researcher, commentator and journalist. She hails from Ramallah.

Career 
She obtained BA in English language and English Literature from the Birzeit University with a focus on sociolinguistics. She received MSc degree in Sociology and Global Change from the University of Edinburgh with a focus on Israeli Ashkenazi-Mizrahi racial hierarchies. She is also known for undertaking monitoring and evaluation missions of humanitarian and development aid in countries such as Jordan, Syria, and Lebanon, along with Palestine, a non-member observer state of the UN, and for various governmental as well as non-governmental organisations.

Her political commentary and research work has notably featured in CNN, Al Jazeera English, The Guardian, BBC, Huffington Post, The New York Times, Middle East Monitor, Newsweek, Mondoweiss, International Business Times and TRT-World. Mariam has also contributed to various books and anthologies including, I found Myself in Palestine. Mariam has also written profiles on Palestinian figures including Palestinian artist Khaled Hourani and Palestinian official and politician Dr. Hanan Ashrawi.

She has been vocal in her examination of media double standards when reporting on Palestine. She has also remained vocal about Israeli violations against Palestinians through storytelling and writing. Her reporting helped raise global awareness about the harsh realities and experiences faced by Palestinians under Israeli control. During the 2021 Israel–Palestine crisis, she has often raised her concerns on what she says is Israel's suppression attitude towards Palestine through her work on the ground as a researcher, journalist, and listener.

In May 2021, Twitter restricted the official Twitter account of Mariam who was reporting on the protests from the West Bank during the 2021 Israel-Palestine crisis, Jerusalem, and Palestinians with Israeli citizenship. Barghouti said Twitter had temporarily suspended some of her tweets on the violence being imposed by Palestinian security forces and Israeli army. The company later said the account restriction was due to an error.

References 

Living people
Year of birth missing (living people)
Palestinian women writers
Palestinian human rights activists
Palestinian women journalists
Palestinian activists
Palestinian expatriates in the United States
Birzeit University alumni
Alumni of the University of Edinburgh